Eugenia punicifolia is a species of plant in the family Myrtaceae. It is found in Bolivia and Brazil.

References

External links
 
 

punicifolia
Flora of Brazil
Flora of Bolivia
Flora of Peru